The women's scratch at the 2010 Dutch National Track Championships in Apeldoorn took place at Omnisport Apeldoorn on December 30, 2010. 18 athletes participated in the contest.

Winanda Spoor won the gold medal, Roxane Knetemann took silver and Ellen van Dijk won the bronze.

Competition format
There were no qualification rounds for this discipline. Consequently, the event was run direct to the final. The competition consisted on 40 laps, making a total of 10 km.

Results

Results from wielerpunt.com.

References

Women's scratch
Dutch National Track Championships – Women's scratch